Nazareth Academy, formerly St. Michael's School is a Roman Catholic secondary school in Old Karimganj, Gaya, Bihar, India in the Roman Catholic Archdiocese of Patna. Kids stay at the school in grades 1–12.

Nazareth Academy got a Platinum Jubilee in 2014.

Etymology
St. Michael's School had its name changed in 1953 by Sisters Charity of Nazareth by Ann Bernadette, Patricia Mary and Ellen Maria. The new name of the school was named after Nazareth, a city in Israel which is known to be the home of Jesus Christ.

History
The school was established as Saint Michael's School Gaya, Bihar in 1939. Nazareth Academy, Gaya was founded in 1953, under control of the Sisters of Charity of Nazareth by Sister Ann Bernadette, Sister Patricia Mary and Sister Ellen Maria. It is associated with the Roman Catholic Archdiocese of Patna.

Though it has been a school for more than fifty years it has not always been Nazareth Academy. The doors of the school actually opened on 2 February 1939 under the banner of Saint Michael's School. Under the leadership of Mother Engelbert, the Sisters of the institute of the Blessed Virgin Mary came to establish this first convent school in Gaya. The school was originally Hindi medium, though it slowly evolved into two sections - Hindi and English - and ultimately it became English medium with Hindi as a subject.

By 1953 ground was broken for school building with five new classrooms. In 1955, the former Mazumdar property next door was purchased. 1964 saw the third story put on the building of 1953 plus a further wing of nine more classrooms The School hall and library room were additions of' 1969, followed in 1974-76 by the high school building of twelve more class rooms. The Administration block was built in 1990 and Primary Section block was built in 1993. The newest construction in the campus situated in front of the auditorium consists of two state-of-the-art computer labs, mathematics and language labs was inaugurated on 22 October 2009.
The first location of the school was in a house on Katari Hill Road. Two moves after that, by 1942, it had shifted to the present site, which had been originally a Masonic Lodge, and later a private residence expanded by the owner into its present form.

Mother Engelbert, Sister Carina, Sister Melita, and Sister Stanislaus by their zeal and dedication, laid a firm and lasting foundation; and only the course of history halted the progress they and their fellow Sisters were making in those first years – World War II came, and by mid 1942, the Sisters, who belonged to the German Loreto Sisters, had to leave Gaya for their larger institutions in India. One of the teachers of beloved memory in Gaya was Miss Alma John who was on the staff of Saint Michael's and some years later joined Nazareth Academy.

A second group of Sisters, the Irish Loreto Mothers, took over the school in 1943. The school, under its second name, Loreto Convent, continued to progress and grow in numbers. It had been co-educational from the very beginning. Classes were added on and by the late 1940s students were being prepared for both Junior and Senior Cambridge examinations, which they took as private candidates in the recognized Cambridge schools in Patna. Again history intervened. The large Loreto institutions in India were in need of more personnel, and in 1950 the administration decided to close the institution which was to be Nazareth Academy. With heavy hearts the Sisters bade farewell to a school that had become very dear to them. Mother Helena, Mother Pauline, Mother Raphael, Mother Victorine, Mother Germaine and Mother Agnes (both died in Gaya), Mother Plauline and Sister Jude and others were among the Sisters who had continued building up the educational institution which was Loreto Convent and which, in January 1951, became Nazareth Academy.
The band of four Sisters of Charity of Nazareth who arrived 28 December 1950 to staff this well established school were : Sister Charles Miriam, Sister Ann Bernacette, Sister Ann Roberta, and Sister Ellen Maria. Sister Charles Miriam took up the administration as Principal with great vigour. She and the other Sisters and teachers tried to maintain the line traditions set up by their predecessors and at the same time promote the progress and expansion of the school.

The course of studies has also changed considerably. The Junior and Senior Cambridge Courses were eventually discarded, and for some years the students became private candidates for the Bihar Board examinations. For a few years boys were allowed only up to class VII, but by 1975 they were again admitted for all classes up through matriculation. In 1981 recognition from the Central Board of Secondary Education in Delhi was obtained, and the first candidates passed in 1983. Each year has seen a class of approximately 140 boys and girls passing the All India Secondary School Examination of the Delhi Board. At present it is a Senior Secondary School. With increased enrollment, the school staff has also expanded. The first two Principals, Sister Charles Miriam and Sister James Leo, availing themselves of the strong foundation of their predecessors, continued to maintain tile traditions already established and to expand on the good scholastic standards attained, the years rolled by, the teaching staff expanded, and the school passed gradually from American to Indian hands. Subsequent Principals have been: Sister Anne Marie, Sister Ann George, Sister Ann Palatty, Sister Reena, Sister Vijaya and the present principal Sister Sophia Joseph . Under their able guidance, the school has grown and developed enlarging its influence and its scope from year to year.

Administration

Student council
The Students Council is a body of students representatives led by the Student Leaders: Head Girl and Head Boy. The members are the Vice leaders, Captains and Vice Captains of various Houses.
The main purpose of this group is to assist the Principal, Vice Principal and the staff and students for the smooth carrying out of various activities of the school. The opportunities for exercising democratic and participatory leadership skills prepares these young leaders to discover their potential and take up greater responsibilities in life. the Principal and the Vice Principal guides this team. this group helps in the maintenance of law and order in the school during the Assembly, the Breaks, Dismissal and also on important occasions.

Co-curricular activities
The years a student spends in the school should enable him/her to acquire principles of good conduct and action and lay solid foundation for true purposeful living when he/she attains adulthood. Principles of honesty, trust, cooperation, self-reliance and hard work are inculcated through various school activities. In these activities the student learns to do things himself/herself under the steady supervision of teachers. They are given the opportunity to see practical application of the abstract ideas of give and take that they learn in the classroom.

Certain activities are conducted under the House system. The entire school is divided into four houses: Red, Blue, Green, and Yellow, in order to encourage team spirit and cooperation. Activities like dramatics, elocution, singing, dancing, drawing and painting, essay writing, and debates are carried out under the guidance of the teachers.

Nazareth Gyan Jyoti School

Nazareth Gyan Jyoti School (Formerly known as After Noon School) is an integral part of Nazareth Academy's outreach program. It was begun in 1975 when the Sisters became acutely aware of education for the non-school going children of their neighbourhood. Non-formal classes were conducted after regular school hours. In later years as the number of children increased, the school was formally organized with a set of teachers and formal classes for three hours daily. At present there are over 300 children from classes KG to VIII. some of the older children attend government schools in the morning hours and make use of the benefits provided by the government.

Nazareth Old Students Association
Nazareth Old Students Association(NOSA) is an alumnus organization for graduates of Nazareth Academy. It was founded in 1975 by the graduating class of that year. It is among the oldest alumni associations in India. It has over 5,000 members. The association allows alumnus of Nazareth to remain connected with the school. Over 500 alumnus of the school meet from across India in its yearly reunions. 

NOSA organizes welfare activities for its alumnus. NOSA also conducts a free health check-up of the school students by doctors who are Nazareth pass outs. Through such interactions, the alumni teaches young people the past of Nazareth Academy. Some of the alumnus also offer sports training to the current students. The alumni association also funds various school projects. It also finances poor students of the school, giving prizes worth ₹15,000 annually to toppers of various subjects.

Nazareth Old Students Association has chapters in Delhi, Mumbai, and Gaya.

Photo gallery

References

External links
Official website
School location

1939 establishments in India